Mohammad Farouk Tayfour is the deputy leader of the Muslim Brotherhood of Syria. Tayfour was elected to the general secretariat of the Syrian National Council on 9 November 2012.

References

Living people
Islamic democracy activists
Syrian democracy activists
Syrian politicians
Date of birth missing (living people)
Year of birth missing (living people)